Gelston is a village in the South Kesteven district of Lincolnshire, England.

The village is included in the ecclesiastical parish of Hough-on-the Hill, part of the Loveden Deanery of the Diocese of Lincoln.

History
According to A Dictionary of British Place Names, Gelston could be "a farmstead or a village of a man called Gjofull" – 'Gels' from an Old Scandinavian person name and 'ton' Old English for "enclosure, farmstead, village, manor [or] estate".

Gelston is referred to in the 1086 Domesday account as "Chevelestune" in the manor of Hough-on-the-Hill, and in the Loveden Hundred of Kesteven. In 1066 Earl Ralph was Lord of the Manor; after 1086 this transferred to Count Alan of Brittany, who also became Tenant-in-chief.

In 1885 Kelly's Directory noted: "at Gelston there is a place of worship for Wesleyan Methodists; and an ancient cross". The Wesleyan chapel was built in 1839, closed in 1958, and is now a private residence. The medieval limestone cross on the village green dates from the 15th century, is Grade II listed and is a scheduled ancient monument.

References

External links

Villages in Lincolnshire
South Kesteven District